Brazil has participated in all the Lusophone Games since the beginning in 2006. Brazil is the first in the all time medal table.

Medal tables

By championships

By sports
Updated after the 2009 Lusophone Games

See also
 Brazil at the 2006 Lusophone Games
 Brazil at the 2009 Lusophone Games

References

Brazil